Burnt Peak is the highest peak of the Sierra Pelona, located in northwestern Los Angeles County, Southern California. The peak is home to a VOR air navigation beacon.

Geography
The mountain,  in elevation, is protected within the Angeles National Forest. It is north of Santa Clarita, west of Lake Hughes, and east of the Ridge Route. Just a few miles north lies the unincorporated town of Three Points.

The Sierra Pelona Mountains are part of the Transverse Ranges System.

See also
  – related topics
 Sandberg, California

References 

 

Mountains of Los Angeles County, California
Sierra Pelona Ridge
Angeles National Forest
Mountains of Southern California